The men's 4 × 400 metres relay event at the 2003 All-Africa Games was held on October 15.

Results

References
Results
Results

4 x 400